BEAN, a non-profit organization based in Seattle, Washington, United States, encourages volunteerism for young professionals and benefits local and international charitable organizations. BEAN was founded in 2002 by Howard Wu. BEAN currently has chapters in Seattle, San Francisco, Phoenix, Minneapolis, New York, Philadelphia, Shanghai, Hong Kong and Seoul.

References

External links 
 

Charities based in Washington (state)
Companies based in Seattle
Companies based in Shanghai
Service organizations based in the United States
Non-profit organizations based in Seattle
Social welfare charities based in the United States